The Tanzania Conservation Resource Centre (CRC) is a non-profit educational and research-support organization based in Arusha, Tanzania. Founded in 2006, the Centre has a small library of primarily conservation materials (both electronic and in print) and provides services for visiting researchers and local students.

CRC has operated for over five  years in Tanzania, supporting conservation and wildlife research through capacity-building and networking for local and foreign researchers and students. The Centre has an office near the Njiro cinema complex in Arusha, and provides logistical, informational and networking support.

The CRC provides a way for students to connect with researchers and their projects, and provides a database of both projects and of students seeking positions.

See also
List of Tanzanian conservation organisations

External links 
CRC home page

Nature conservation in Tanzania
Organisations based in Tanzania
Organizations established in 2006
2006 establishments in Tanzania